Stacey Slater (also Branning and Fowler) is a fictional character from the BBC soap opera EastEnders, portrayed by Lacey Turner. She first appears in episode 2826, originally broadcast on 1 November 2004. The character is introduced as a feisty and troublesome teenager and extension to the already established Slater family. She was created by scriptwriter Tony Jordan with Turner in mind. Producers explored the character's backstory with the introduction of her mother, Jean Slater (Gillian Wright), who has bipolar disorder. They then paired Stacey with Bradley Branning (Charlie Clements) and writers developed a series of problems for their marriage, including an abortion and Stacey's affair with Bradley's father, Max Branning (Jake Wood).

In 2009, the character was placed in an issue-led storyline when she is diagnosed with bipolar disorder; the show worked with various charities to develop the story. Writers also incorporated Stacey in the "Who Killed Archie?" plot and revealed her as his killer in a live episode, which was followed by a two-hander episode between Turner and Wood. The story also linked to Stacey becoming pregnant and concluded with Turner's departure from the soap in episode 4129–4130, originally broadcast on 25 December 2010. Three years later, Turner’s anticipated return was announced and Stacey reappears in the episode originally broadcast on 7 February 2014 before departing again on 24 March 2014. She made a permanent return from 1 September 2014.

Stacey was involved in another issue-led story exploring postpartum psychosis in 2016, following the birth of her son Arthur. Turner went on maternity leave in August 2019 and prior to her exit, Stacey became involved in a custody battle with Kush Kazemi (Davood Ghadami) and a feud with her cousin Kat Slater (Jessie Wallace). After attacking Phil Mitchell (Steve McFadden), Stacey flees the square and is off-screen for thirteen months, returning in September 2020. Turner took a second maternity leave in April 2021 and Stacey departs for six months, after being falsely imprisoned for GBH. She makes two cameo appearances on 16 September and 20 September 2021, before then returning permanently on 25 October. The character has proven popular with fans and critics alike, and Turner has won over thirty awards for her portrayal, the most for any actor or soap in the UK. Her accolades include four National Television Awards, six British Soap Awards and eight Inside Soap Awards.

Storylines

2004–2010
Prior to her arrival, Stacey had a troubled childhood, due to her mother Jean (Gillian Wright) suffering from bipolar disorder, and the death of her father, Brian, when she was 11. Stacey struggled to cope with her mother's suicidal and erratic behaviour, resulting from her illness. For a long time, she was Jean's sole carer as her older brother, Sean (Robert Kazinsky), had disappeared, unable to cope with Jean's condition.

Stacey, age 15, follows her family to Walford in November 2004, to live with her great-uncle Charlie Slater (Derek Martin) and adoptive grandmother Mo Harris (Laila Morse), after being thrown out by her mother, Jean. She causes trouble through her promiscuous and immoral behaviour, which involves seducing her cousin Lynne Hobbs' (Elaine Lordan) husband Garry Hobbs (Ricky Groves). Charlie, fed up with her behaviour, sends her back home to Jean. However, she later returns to the Slaters, eventually growing close to them. Stacey’s paternal grandmother Violet Slater passed away in 1988 before Stacey was born, so Mo made the decision to adopt Stacey as one of her own granddaughters. 

In early 2005, Stacey befriends Ruby Allen (Louisa Lytton), the daughter of gangster Johnny Allen (Billy Murray), and they later become best friends, despite falling out a few times and disapproval from Johnny. Stacey also becomes heavily involved in the murder of Den Watts (Leslie Grantham) when she gives her cousin Zoe Slater (Michelle Ryan) a false alibi for his murder, landing an innocent Sam Mitchell (Kim Medcalf) in prison. Sam's family and Den's adopted daughter Sharon Watts (Letitia Dean) pressure her into telling the truth, and eventually Den's wife Chrissie Watts (Tracy-Ann Oberman) is arrested for the murder. In 2006, Stacey becomes involved in her cousin Little Mo Slater’s (Kacey Ainsworth) love life when she spots a romantic connection between Little Mo’s boyfriend Oliver Cousins (Tom Ellis) and resident Dawn Swann (Kara Tointon). She informs Little Mo of this, resulting in Little Mo and Oliver splitting up.

Despite being initially unimpressed by Walford newcomer Bradley Branning (Charlie Clements), she eventually grows to like him and they start dating. Bradley becomes Stacey's first true love. Stacey is stunned when Sean appears back in her life after seven years, but is happy to have her brother back. Stacey's relationship with Bradley hits a rough patch when Stacey discovers she has been impregnated by Bradley and he urges her to have an abortion. Stacey reluctantly has the abortion and their romance sours. Bradley calls time on his relationship with Stacey when she embarrasses him at a work party. To get back at Bradley, Stacey seduces his father Max Branning (Jake Wood). Subsequently, they begin an affair. Although they agreed that it would only be about sex, Stacey falls in love with Max, but Max rejects her. Eventually, Max also falls for Stacey and agrees to leave his wife, Tanya Branning (Jo Joyner). However, Max has this on a halt as he learns that Tanya is pregnant. While Max and his family are out of town, Stacey reunites with Bradley and accepts his marriage proposal. When Max returns, he declares his love for Stacey and wants to run away with her. Stacey tells Max they are over for good and she is marrying Bradley. Stacey feels overwhelmed on her wedding day and almost does not go through with the ceremony, but Bradley convinces her to marry him. Max propositions Stacey after the wedding ceremony and their kiss is recorded on Max's eldest daughter Lauren's (Madeline Duggan) hidden video camera. Lauren gives a DVD of the recording to Bradley as a Christmas present, revealing the fling to the entire family. Tanya and Bradley are devastated over their spouses' betrayal and both marriages end. Some time later, Bradley decides to give his marriage to Stacey another chance, suggesting that they start a family. Stacey is uncertain and secretly continues taking birth control pills. She has a one-night-stand with Callum Monks (Elliott Jordan). She immediately regrets cheating on Bradley. Stacey attempts to reignite the spark in her marriage, but eventually decides her and Bradley are over. She has a brief relationship with Callum, but they split up over his harsh treatment of her mother.

Following the death of her friend Danielle Jones (Lauren Crace), Stacey begins behaving erratically. She steals money from her family, sleeps with various men on the go and becomes a heavy drinker. She is diagnosed with bipolar disorder, but is non-compliant with her medication and becomes paranoid, experiencing hallucinations. Around this time, Stacey has a one-night-stand with Ryan Malloy (Neil McDermott) and is attacked and raped by Archie Mitchell (Larry Lamb) in the launderette. Stacey's illness convinces her that both men are planning to kill her and after attacking Archie with a broken glass, Stacey is involuntarily committed.

Stacey returns home with Becca Swanson (Simone James), a girl she befriended at the mental hospital. Upon her release, Bradley confesses his feelings for Stacey and they reconcile. Stacey then discovers she is three months pregnant, which means Bradley cannot be the father. On Christmas Day, Stacey tells Bradley that Archie raped her and he must be the father. Archie is murdered that night by an unknown assailant. Stacey and Bradley agree to pretend the baby is theirs, and remarry on 18 February 2010. A jealous Becca reveals the rape to Archie's eldest daughter Ronnie Mitchell (Samantha Womack), who tells Stacey that Archie cannot be the father as he was made infertile following cancer treatment. Becca informs the police that Bradley had a motive for killing Archie. He and Stacey attempt to flee Walford, but Bradley is caught by the police and falls to his death while trying to escape. A distraught Stacey confesses to Max that she was actually the one who killed Archie.

Stacey runs away from Walford, unable to cope with Bradley's death. Max tracks her down to an abandoned house, where Stacey explains that she was angry at Archie and was worried about what Bradley would do to him after he found out about the baby. A minute after Bradley confronted Archie, she found Archie on the floor and, lucid and angered at what he had done to her and to Danielle, pushed the bust onto his head, but ran after his fingers twitched, fearing he would call the police. She balked at telling Bradley the truth about what she did, fearing that he would take the blame for her. When she finally told him while they were packing on their wedding night, Stacey offered to confess to the police herself, but he convinced her to flee Walford with him, regardless, out of his love for her. Reasoning that Bradley only wanted Stacey to be happy, Max brings her back home.

Stacey realises Ryan is the father of her baby, but decides not to tell him. He exhibits a romantic interest in her, which is later revealed to be part of a bet with his girlfriend Janine Butcher (Charlie Brooks). Upset by this revelation, Stacey's water breaks. Ryan stays with her as she gives birth to her daughter, whom she names Lily. When Ryan later rescues them from a fire at The Queen Victoria pub, Stacey admits that he is Lily's father. Ryan initially refuses to act as a parent to her, but he eventually bonds with Lily when given the chance to look after her. Janine grows increasingly jealous and it eventually escalates to her kidnapping Lily, but Ryan gets her back. Stacey and Ryan grow closer, spending time together, and they share a kiss. During this time, Lauren (now Jacqueline Jossa) discovers Stacey murdered Archie and records a confession on her phone. Stacey attempts to flee to Palma, Majorca, but Ryan stops her and confesses his feelings for her. They start an affair, but, unbeknownst to them, Janine finds out and poisons Ryan in revenge. Ryan is hospitalised and on his return, he convinces Janine he loves her but later publicly declares his love for Stacey in The Vic. Janine concedes defeat until Lauren, who still believes Max is emotionally involved with Stacey, gives Janine the recorded confession. The next day, Janine attempts to play the recording in front of customers in The Vic, but it has been recorded over because Lauren warned Max. Janine says that Stacey killed Archie but no one believes her. Stacey leaves the pub in tears, followed by Ryan. She then breaks down and tells Ryan that Janine is telling the truth.

On Christmas Day, Stacey tells Jean she killed Archie, so a panicked Jean takes Lily away from her. Ryan convinces Stacey to leave with him as Janine will call the police. Stacey lets Janine in and she tries to set Stacey up for attempted murder by grabbing a knife, placing it in Stacey's hand and stabbing herself. Stacey runs out of the house covered in blood and Janine convinces Jean to call the police. Stacey contemplates suicide but Max stops her and says he will help her escape. Stacey convinces Jean that Janine has framed her and Ryan plans to run away with her. Stacey tells Ryan she does not want him to come with her, because she is not sure whether she really loves him. Ronnie and her younger sister Roxy Mitchell (Rita Simons) confront her over their father's murder, and Stacey confesses that she did kill Archie. Ronnie tells her to leave town, realising that she has suffered enough, and Max drives her to the airport as the police arrive on the Square. At the airport, Max tells her he loves her and offers to leave with her, but she tells him she only ever loved Bradley. She and Lily then board a flight and leave the country. The next day, Kat Moon (Jessie Wallace) receives a phone call from Stacey, saying that she and Lily are safe and well in Mexico.

2014–present
Kat sees Stacey walking into a salon, from the top deck of a bus in London. Kat finds out where she lives and visits, where she meets Lily (Aine Garvey) and Stacey's boyfriend, Luke Riley (Matt Willis). Luke believes that Stacey's name is "Jenny Smith" and is unaware of her criminal history. Stacey sees Kat leaving and heads back to Albert Square to confront her. Kat later tells Luke "Jenny" is really Stacey so he ends their relationship and throws both Stacey and Lily out. Stacey and Kat then visit Janine in prison to ask her to withdraw the statement she made accusing Stacey of stabbing her, over three years ago. Janine reluctantly agrees, so Stacey can return to Albert Square. Luke visits Stacey, but leaves, after discovering that she murdered a man. Stacey decides to finally clear Bradley's name and calls the police, telling them that she killed Archie. She is arrested and later sentenced to five years in prison. After realising how much Lily is missing her, she decides to appeal her sentence on grounds of diminished responsibility, because of her bipolar disorder, and her appeal is successful. Stacey returns to Walford, moving in with Kat and Alfie. As part of an insurance scheme, Alfie commits arson, destroying the home. Stacey works for Dean Wicks (Matt Di Angelo) at his salon, "Blades", and they start dating. She and Lily move into Dean's flat and Stacey discovers that Alfie caused the fire. Stacey is disgusted when she discovers that Dean raped Linda Carter (Kellie Bright), and ends their relationship.

Stacey talks to Sean over video chat, and he tells her to look after a mysterious key belonging to their father late father. Stacey is worried about Kat and Alfie leaving, following their lottery win. She is roughed up by Dean, who asks her about his daughter with Shabnam Masood (Rakhee Thakrar). Shabnam's on-off boyfriend Kush Kazemi (Davood Ghadami) rescues her; they kiss and she tells him that Shabnam had a daughter she abandoned. Kush's friend, Martin Fowler (James Bye) becomes her flatmate. Martin and Stacey date briefly before she realises she has feelings for Kush, despite his engagement to Shabnam. They kiss for a second time but they regret it. Stacey is jealous when Shabnam reveals she is pregnant, and Stacey reconciles with Martin. Jean returns and reveals that she is marrying Ollie Walters (Tony O'Callaghan) the next day. Jean sees the key and becomes angry, so Stacey is curious and tries to find what the key is for, to no avail; Jean pretends to flush the key down the toilet. Stacey discovers she is pregnant, but Martin asks her to get a termination, claiming that it is too soon in their relationship. She decides to keep the baby after a talk with Shabnam and Martin agrees to stand by her.

Stacey is spooked when a man she does not know begins to follow her. Unbeknownst to Stacey, the man, Kyle (Riley Carter Millington), also has a key like hers. When Stacey finds out Martin is planning to propose, she says she does not want to get married again. He later proposes that she become his "not-wife", so they are committed but not married, and she agrees. When Lee Carter (Danny Hatchard) fails to correctly fix a faulty electric socket, Stacey is electrocuted. She and her baby are fine, and she finds out she is having a boy. She forgives Lee, and tells Shabnam that she saw her dead father Brian when she was electrocuted. When Shabnam finds the baby scan Stacey is hiding, Stacey throws her out of the flat and tears up the scan photo. When Shabnam asks why Stacey is hiding the photo from Martin, Stacey admits he is not the father but the real father was a one-night stand before getting together with him. When Kush confronts her, she tells him that she thinks he could be the father. Kush's mother Carmel Kazemi (Bonnie Langford) notices Kush and Stacey talking, and realises that he could be the father of Stacey's baby. Kush and Stacey convince Carmel not to tell Shabnam or Martin. When Stacey later attends a church service and prays for her father, she sees Kyle, who then leaves suddenly without telling her who he is, causing her to become more suspicious.

Stacey tells Martin she has a stalker, and when Jean and Ollie visit, she tells them too. Stacey realises that Jean knows who it is, and when she asks, Jean produces the key. Jean reveals the key is for Brian's safety deposit box in a bank. Stacey opens the box but it is empty, so when she confronts Jean, Jean reveals that Brian had another family with another woman, saying they planned to give Stacey the key when she turned 21 but after Brian's death, Sean stole it. Jean reveals that Kyle has been trying to contact her and Stacey through letters, making Stacey realise that Kyle is her half-brother. Kush tells Stacey that they must tell the truth to Shabnam and Martin about the paternity of Stacey's baby. Stacey gives birth at Lily's nativity play and Martin names the baby Arthur Fowler, after his father. When Kush holds the baby, his behaviour makes Shabnam realise that he could be Arthur's father. Shabnam confronts Stacey but she denies Kush is the father.

Kat visits Stacey for Christmas 2015 and discovers that Martin is not Arthur's father, urging Stacey to tell him the truth. As Stacey is about to do so, Kyle approaches her and formally introduces himself to her as her half-brother. After overhearing Kat talk to someone about a baby being stolen, Stacey fears for Arthur's safety and takes refuge in the church, where Dot Branning (June Brown), who has been teaching her about Christianity, finds her and tells her the story of the Massacre of the Innocents, causing Stacey to believe that Arthur is in danger. Believing people are trying to harm Arthur, Stacey unsuccessfully attempts to baptise Arthur through Dot's sink. She discovers that Charlie has died, so flees and meets Kyle, asking him to run away with her. Martin calls her, claiming that Kyle is not who he says he is and Stacey accuses Kyle of being the devil. She takes a cab and sees a vision of Charlie driving it, and he convinces her to return home to Walford. During a storm she goes to the roof of The Queen Vic, saying that God is coming for Arthur. Martin finds her there and she tells him that Arthur was sent from God and now she is waiting for God to rescue them. Martin is forced to go along with this and convinces her to come home with him.

By the time of Charlie's funeral, Stacey is convinced that Martin is a demon who is working with the devil. Eventually, Martin convinces her that he is not a demon and that a hospital is the safest place for her and Arthur. However, she is then sectioned after refusing to voluntarily admit herself, because she will be separated from Arthur. Stacey tells the doctor she has been hearing God's voice since Arthur's birth at Christmas, so the doctor suspects she is suffering from postpartum psychosis. Martin apologises to her and promises to make things right, determined to find a way to bring her back together with Arthur. Shabnam soon realises that Stacey wants to see Arthur, so goes to Martin with the idea of getting Stacey and Arthur taken to a mother and baby care unit. When Shabnam decides to leave Walford, Stacey finally admits that Kush is Arthur's father, showing that she is starting to recover. Martin finds a mother and baby unit for Stacey in Essex, and takes her and Arthur there. Stacey writes Martin a letter revealing that Arthur is Kush's son, but decides not to send it, however a nurse finds it and gives it to Martin; Martin is heartbroken. Stacey begs for his forgiveness, but he goes to America, returning a few weeks later and they reunite. Stacey is allowed a home visit, where she meets Kyle again. He explains that he is transgender and he used to be her sister but is now her brother. Stacey accepts and supports him and allows him to stay at her and Martin's flat. Stacey says she no longer wants to be Martin's "not-wife" and proposes to him, which he accepts, and tells Kush he can be part of Arthur's life, but Kush later decides he does not want to be Arthur's role model. Stacey is discharged from the mother and baby unit.

After being released, Stacey tries to talk to Masood but instead he rebuffs her apology, blaming her for Shabnam leaving. Carmel tries to persuade Masood to forgive her but instead gets angry when Masood does not show interest. Martin and Kyle think Stacey is putting too much pressure on herself when she invites Jean, Ollie and her cousin Belinda Peacock (Carli Norris) for a family dinner. During the dinner, Jean does not accept that Kyle is transgender and instead calls him a liar, while also clashing with Belinda. Stacey later argues with Jean to accept and believe Kyle but instead Jean leaves. Belinda then reveals that Stacey and Martin may have to move out because Kat is due to stop paying their rent soon. Martin's attempts to make money fail, and he takes work away from home. While he is gone, Andy Flynn (Jack Derges) invites himself into Stacey's home and they become friendly; Stacey soon realises he is homeless. She also contacts Kyle's mother Alison Slater (Denise Welch) who visits, but she refuses to accept him. To help with Martin's money problems, Andy tells him he can help him steal some toilets that were delivered in error to the building site he is working on, which is the house next to Martin and Stacey's flat. Andy, Martin, Stacey and Kyle successfully steal them but fail to sell them. Belinda then moves in after leaving her husband Neville Peacock (Gary Webster), and they are all forced to return the toilets when Belinda inadvertently tries to sell them back to Jack Branning (Scott Maslen), from whom they were stolen. Stacey and Martin then marry.

Stacey helps Belinda out at her new salon and Belinda is impressed with her. Martin's teenage daughter Bex Fowler (Jasmine Armfield) confides in Stacey about her boyfriend Shakil Kazemi (Shaheen Jafargholi) wanting sex with her and asks for advice. When Bex's mother and Martin's former wife Sonia Jackson (Natalie Cassidy) leaves Walford temporarily, Bex moves in with the Fowlers, leaving the flat overcrowded, so they move into Sonia's old house. Max returns to Walford after being wrongly imprisoned for murdering Lucy Beale (Hetti Bywater), and Stacey is happy that he is back. Stacey is upset when Martin is involved in a bus crash but he recovers and agrees to having a baby with Stacey. Stacey and Martin decide to keep their distance from the Kazemis following Bex's bullying ordeal, caused by an explicit photo of Shakil being distributed from Bex's phone. Carmel is hurt with being excluded from Arthur's life and Stacey and Carmel fight when Carmel makes remarks about Stacey's mental health, so Stacey bans her from seeing Arthur. However, Max persuades Stacey to let Carmel be involved with Arthur. Stacey tells Martin that she is pregnant and they agree to seek medical advice because she is worried about her postpartum psychosis returning. In July 2017, Stacey goes for a job interview at The Queen Vic and is accepted as a barmaid there once again.

After a gas explosion in Albert Square, Martin panics when he cannot find Stacey and hits a police officer in confusion, resulting in two weeks imprisonment. Kush suffers a cardiac arrest and is diagnosed with Brugada Syndrome, which is hereditary, meaning Arthur could have it, so Stacey worries that Arthur could die. Carmel witnesses a stressed Stacey physically taking Lily upstairs and refuses to leave Stacey with Lily and Arthur. Following an ECG, it is confirmed that Arthur is at high risk at having Brugada Syndrome, but he cannot have an operation or tests due to his age. His parents are told about equipment that is not available on the NHS that can help Arthur, which Kush provides, angering Stacey as Martin asked Kush for the money. Arthur falls unconscious and Stacey and Martin are told that Arthur has swallowed Stacey's bipolar medication. Carmel is horrified when she finds bruises on Arthur's arms, and expresses her concerns to Kush that Stacey is unwell, while Stacey tells Martin's sister Michelle Fowler (Jenna Russell) that he gained the bruises in hospital. However, Lily tells Carmel that Stacey was responsible, so Carmel reports this to social services, but tries to retract what she said after realising it was a mistake. Social services visit the family and place Arthur and Lily in Carmel's care until they have investigated. A doctor has no concerns about Arthur, so the children are returned to Stacey and Martin, though are subject to further home visits. Lily then tells Stacey and Martin that she caused Arthur's bruises. After speaking with Lily, social worker Fiona Payne (Sandra James-Young) tells Stacey and Martin that Lily feels pushed out with Arthur and is anxious about the new baby. Carmel admits that she called social services, enraging Stacey. After screaming at Carmel and Kush, Stacey suffers an eclamptic seizure and is rushed to the hospital, where she and Martin are told her baby will have to be delivered prematurely due to a lack of oxygen. The baby is delivered, though Martin is told that there are complications. Stacey does not want to see the baby at first but later does, and they name her Hope.

When Max is rejected by his family and friends after it is revealed that he has been conning them out of their businesses so that the area can be redeveloped, Stacey is one of the few people to offer him support. Stacey hears from Lauren that Max has tried killing Ian Beale (Adam Woodyatt) and tries calming him down, letting him stay with her and Martin, however, they nearly kiss. Martin is unconvinced that Max will not come between Stacey and their family, so asks Stacey to get Max to leave, which she does. Max tricks Stacey into returning home and tries to convince her there is still a spark between them. Stacey initially resists but gives in and they have sex. Stacey's phone is posted through the letter box and she finds it the next day. Max realises that Jane Beale (Laurie Brett) has left messages for Stacey and deletes them. However, Tanya returns to take her daughters away as she has heard from Jane what Max has done, and, disgusted to learn that Max and Stacey have restarted their affair, reveals to Stacey that Max killed Steven Beale (Aaron Sidwell) and tried to kill Jane, which is overheard by both Abi and Martin. Max denies this but later admits to Stacey that it is true but he had good reasons. Stacey rejects him, saying he will never changed and she wishes he had died instead of Bradley. Max contemplates suicide by jumping from the roof of the Vic but Lauren and Abi talk him down, however, Stacey watches as they fall and are severely injured. Martin tells Stacey they should continue as normal, pretending that nothing has happened, but Stacey admits to having sex with Max, saying they need to talk about it or their relationship will not have a chance. Martin refuses to talk to Stacey about it so it does not ruin Christmas for their children and that he will not accept blame for her actions. Stacey explains that she had sex with Max as she and Martin never have time for themselves and she is left to manage the house. Martin decides to make up with Stacey after speaking to Ted Murray (Christopher Timothy), but Stacey leaves Walford with Lily, Arthur and Hope, choosing to live with Jean for a while.

Stacey returns and after accusations and arguments with Martin, he throws her out and exposes her affair, but Stacey gains entry to the house and has the locks changed. An unknown relative of Stacey's, Hayley Slater (Katie Jarvis), starts taking photos of Martin and Stacey. Martin attempts to delete an email from Stacey's account about filing for divorce upon organising a childcare rota. When Martin is late returning Hope after being distracted by Hayley, Hayley whispers to Stacey who she is and Stacey does not want Hayley around her, but she later gets in touch with Hayley when she receives a letter accidentally from Martin's solicitor. When Martin spends time with Hayley, she encourages Martin to take the children out, disobeying Stacey's instructions. Hayley pretends to defend Martin in front of Stacey when she collects Arthur and Hope with police presence due to Martin not returning them. Later, Hayley visits Stacey and warns her not to soften towards Martin when she feels guilty as they are cousins and Slater girls. Stacey is devastated when Big Mo returns to Walford with the news Kat is dead and she and Martin become intimate when he supports her through her grief. Friends suggest fundraising ideas for Kat's funeral, but Jean later arrives when a concerned Martin contacts her. Jean tells Stacey and Mo that Kat could not be dead as she spoke to her earlier on the phone, but when Stacey checks Jean’s call history, there are no calls from Kat. Mo encourages Stacey to put it down to Jean not taking her bipolar medication. Stacey later questions Mo and is left furious when she discovers that Jean was right, Kat had actually not died and Mo used Kat dying as an excuse because she is in financial trouble and a mob is after her. Kat suddenly arrives back in Walford in a cab and is confused that The Queen Vic is holding a benefit night in memory of her. She is then annoyed with Mo when she learns the truth, but is forced to hide in a cupboard when Ian visits with the raised money. Annie Pritchard (Martha Howe-Douglas), the daughter of Terry, who is the man that Mo conned money from, arrives on the Slaters doorstep to get her father’s money back, but the family fool her into believing Mo has died. Kat, Stacey and Mo arrive at The Queen Vic just as Mick is giving a speech about Kat and attempt to maintain that Mo made a mistake about Kat dying, the residents think the Slaters are conwomen and a bar fight soon starts. When Annie returns, Jean pays Annie the money back, and Annie leaves. Jean decides to stay in Walford until she is paid back. Kat starts a cleaning business with Stacey, Jean and Mo so they can pay Jean back. Stacey gets jealous when she sees Martin’s close relationship with his old friend Mel Owen (Tamzin Outhwaite), who eventually offers the Slaters a contract to clean the re-opened E20. Stacey is also displeased when Hayley returns and Martin discovers Stacey is related to Hayley when Stacey declares that she still loves him. After going out with Martin, Sonia arranges a break away for them, but changes her mind when she witnesses Martin comforting Stacey and instead insists that Martin reconcile with Stacey. Stacey and Martin's reunion becomes public knowledge when they are caught together in the shed at the allotments and later in Martin's van. Martin then moves back in with Stacey and the kids.

Stacey reunites with her old friend Ruby at the E20 on a night out and they attend Martin's school reunion. The next day, Ruby tells Stacey she had sex with two of Martin's friends but only said yes to one of them. Stacey convinces her she was raped and supports her as she reports it to the police. Stacey supports Ruby through her rape ordeal and eventually the men responsible for Ruby's rape are charged and sentenced to 10 years imprisonment. Unknown to Stacey, Jean has been diagnosed with ovarian cancer and hides this from the family. Kat finds out and reveals this to Stacey. Stacey tries to support Jean, but she runs away, although she is later found and persuaded back to Walford. Jean decides to stay with Shirley Carter (Linda Henry) and her family at The Queen Vic, despite Stacey pleading with Jean to return home. Fearing that Jean's cancer will worsen, Stacey decides to contact Sean and tell him about Jean's cancer. Whilst picking up the children from school, Stacey discovers that Amy Mitchell (Abbie Burke) is missing and unbeknownst to her, Sean has picked Amy up and returns her to Walford. Stacey confronts Sean at the pub and Sean is angry at Stacey for not telling him about Roxy's death. Sean goes missing and Stacey and Jean manage to trace him at a barn at the point of suicide. Sean reveals that he killed their father during an argument, but Stacey and Jean forgive him and manage to talk him out of suicide. Stacey falls out with Kat after she doesn't tell her about Kush's plans to go for joint custody of Arthur and disowns her as family, stealing £50,000 from Kat which belongs to Phil Mitchell (Steve McFadden), however she gives the money back after Phil threatens the family. A few weeks later Stacey spends a night at Max's house after seeing him drunk and finds out that he is self harming, her friendship with Ruby then becomes strained after she starts a relationship with Max. After an argument with Martin, Stacey admits to him that she is jealous of Max and Ruby and so he walks out of The Queen Vic from her. Later on Kat and Martin get into a fight with Phil in his garage, leading to Phil attempting to strangle Martin. He is then hit over the head with a wrench, and it is revealed that Stacey is the culprit, as she did it to save Martin. He is left at the bottom of the pit, seemingly "dead", fighting for his life. Stacey and Martin flee Walford with Lily and Hope to go on the run to evade potential arrest leaving behind Arthur who stays with Kush.

Martin returns to Walford two months later when Bex attempts suicide. He encounters Phil's son, Ben Mitchell (Max Bowden), who blackmails him into performing illegal activity for him in exchange for Stacey's safety. When Ben threatens to kill Stacey and their children, Martin visits her and ends their marriage, lying that he has had sex with Sonia and wants to be in a relationship with her, devastating Stacey. When Ben relieves Martin of his illegal duties and retracts his threat to hurt Stacey and the children, Martin tries to contact Stacey to no avail. A man, Jerome (Chris Charles), then arrives at the Slater household to collect the belongings of Stacey and the children, which Martin contests. Martin later receives divorce papers, on the grounds of adultery, from Stacey's lawyer.

One year later. Ruby learns that someone has been illegally withdrawing money from her bank account; she soon discovers it is Stacey, who has learnt about her relationship with Martin. Stacey returns to Walford to Jean's displeasure, and also meets with Martin, allowing him to spend time with Hope and Lily (now played by Lillia Turner). After talking to Martin, Ruby confronts Stacey and gives her an ultimatum: Stacey stays in Walford and pays her back or she will report her to the police. Stacey tries to make amends with Jean and after learning about Suki Panesar's (Balvinder Sopal) behaviour towards Jean, she confronts Suki, but is stopped by Jean. Stacey is surprised to learn that Martin lied about cheating to protect her from Ben, and becomes upset when she spots Martin and Ruby kiss. Stacey is disappointed when she learns that Martin and Ruby had secretly married whilst on holiday, leading to a confrontation at Ruby's when Ruby purposely makes Stacey jealous. She criticizes Ruby to Kat and Lily, who reveals what Stacey had said about Ruby. The following day, Martin and Ruby spend time with the children and believing that Ruby is trying to take her children from her which she isn't and doesn't care about them, Stacey goes to confront her and on her way there, Stacey is attacked by an unseen man, who was instructed by Ruby to attack Stacey. Kheerat Panesar (Jaz Deol) comes to Stacey's aid and calms her down; they discuss their respective love of their life relationships with Bradley Branning and Chantelle Atkins (Jessica Plummer), before having sex. Kheerat decides to offer Stacey a job as a receptionist at his pest control business which Suki refuses, though Stacey later turns down the job.

On Christmas Day, Stacey mistakenly receives an expensive watch from Martin, which was meant for Ruby, leading her to believe that Martin wants to resume their relationship, so she kisses him. However, Martin rejects her and Ruby warns Stacey to stay away from Martin. On New Year's Day, Kush takes Arthur and attempts to flee the country but Whitney is able to talk Kush into coming back and then Ruby fakes a pregnancy to hold on to Martin and manipulates him. Ruby and Martin want to take the kids on holiday and Stacey worries if the kids will want to come back to her after the holiday. Stacey finds out that £140 was taken out of her account and confronts Ruby. During the confrontation, Ruby falls down the stairs and pretends she miscarried. Ruby lies to the police and martin that Stacey pushed her with only Jean and Lily believing her. Stacey decides to hand herself in and gets a six-month sentence. She says a tearful goodbye to her family. Jean regularly visits Stacey in prison. Three months later Stacey ends up in a fight and her visitor privileges are withdrawn. And two months later Martin visits Stacey in prison under special visitor orders to explain the situation with Ruby and the kids after lily and Jean were set up as drug dealers and orders Martin to sort her out or She will kill ruby with her bare hands. A few days Jean also visits Stacey after Ruby is sent to prison for the drugs after Jean claimed Ruby was the dealer.

A month later, Stacey is released from prison on probation and returns to Walford. Stacey reveals to Martin that she has got married again, and after a visit from her probation officer, she tells Jean that she has married a woman called Eve Unwin (Heather Peace). Stacey explains that their marriage is a sham and that she offered to marry Eve in order to get her released from prison. Later that day, Eve arrives in Walford and Jean takes an instant dislike to her. Jean calls Sean and he manipulates her into believing that she will ruin Stacey's life and she leaves. Stacey is furious with Jean as Eve has used their address for parole and enlists Martin to help her to find Eve. Stacey grows close to former flame Kheerat but Eve's clashes with Suki push them apart. Eve impersonates her former job as a solicitor to null Suki's eviction, but she discovers their plan and pushes their eviction forward. When Eve clashes with Suki in the café, she orders the Slaters to leave imminently. They later move in with Phil. Stacey opens a food van and clashes with market inspector Honey Mitchell (Emma Barton) when Jean brides her to provide Stacey with a prime spot on the market, and with Suki when Stacey and Eve move the van in front of the Minute Mart. Stacey and Kheerat become close once again and rekindle their romance, however, Stacey becomes unsettled when she sees Kheerat becoming close with Whitney. Stacey helps Kheerat to flee Walford when he attacks Gray Atkins (Toby-Alexander Smith) in self-defence after he reveals that he murdered Chantelle, and she later discovers that he had also pushed Kush in front of the train which killed him. Stacey becomes worried by Jean’s ecstatic behaviour and her speedy relationship with Harvey Monroe (Ross Boatman), and they clash when Stacey is concerned that Jean is unwell again. Jean soon becomes vile towards Stacey, and plans a surprise for the children by purchasing a bouncy castle, and also puts pressure on Stacey to tell Arthur the truth about Kush's death. Stacey is mortified when she sees Jean on the bouncy castle embarrassing herself and also accidentally hurting Arthur. Unable to convince Jean that she is unwell, she prohibits her from being alone with her children unless Jean sees a doctor. However Jean secretly takes Arthur to Walford East Tube station, where Kush died, and she tells Arthur what happened to his father. This leads to an argument in which Jean disowns Stacey and moves in with Harvey. Stacey tries to appeal to Harvey that Jean is experiencing a manic episode, but he refuses to listen. Jean later leaves Walford with Harvey and Stacey pretends to be Jean, to get a doctor's appointment. Jean becomes distant towards Stacey and after much pressure, she agrees to follow Stacey to the GP but leaves midway through the appointment. Jean becomes engaged to Harvey and refuses to invite Stacey to her engagement party. She later escapes to Southend-on-Sea where Stacey and Martin find her and stop her from trying to drown herself. Jean is involuntarily committed and refuses to see Stacey. When Stacey visits Jean, she discovers that she is being bullied by another patient at the mental hospital and brings her back home. Jean remains unwell and refuses to take her medication unless Lily gives it to her, leading to Lily secretly taking them when Jean convinces her that she also has bipolar. Stacey is furious and confronts Jean, leading to Jean accidentally pushing her onto broken glass. Stacey later develops sepsis and collapses. Kheerat, worried for Stacey, tells the doctors what has happened and Stacey worries that Jean will have to go back into involuntary hospitalisation. Jean eventually decides to admit herself. 

During the summer, Stacey is stunned when Lily reveals she has tracked down Kat’s estranged daughter Zoe Slater (Michelle Ryan) on social media and invited her to Kat’s wedding to Phil. Stacey tries to assure Lily that Kat and Zoe’s relationship is complicated and not to intervene. Lily also notices that Zoe is in London and arranges for her to meet with Kat at Peggy’s bar that evening, however, Zoe ignores Lily’s message and does not turn up, leaving the Slaters disappointed.

Stacey is left distraught when Kheerat hands himself in for the murder of Ranveer Gulati (Anil Goutam), taking the blame for Suki, unaware that Ranveer's adopted son, Ravi (Aaron Thiara) is the murderer. Stacey believes that she is pregnant again, but it turns out to be a false alarm following a negative pregnancy test. During a New Year's Eve party at the Slaters, Jean, Lily and Eve suddenly collapse, and it is revealed that they have suffered from carbon monoxide poisoning. However, whilst at the hospital, Stacey is told that Lily is pregnant at twelve years of age, and she names Ricky Mitchell (Frankie Day) as the father following a one-night stand. Lily tells Stacey and Martin that she has decided to terminate the pregnancy as she is not ready to have a baby, however, she later changes her mind following a heart-to-heart with Kat. Stacey and Martin vow to support Lily. Upon Ricky’s parents Sam Mitchell (Kim Medcalf) and Jack Branning (Scott Maslen) discovering the news, they angrily confront the Slaters along with Jack’s civil partner Denise Fox (Diane Parish), and Sam and Jack berate Stacey and Martin for their refusal to have the pregnancy terminated. Stacey tells them that it is Lily’s decision and she is keeping the baby. Sam explains to Stacey that they have rights over the decision too. Lily tells Stacey that Jack tried to manipulate her into having an abortion. Stacey then furiously bans the Brannings and Mitchells from having anything to do with Lily’s baby.

Stacey is furious with Whitney when Lily’s father Ryan Malloy (Neil McDermott) returns to Walford after six years, demanding answers over Lily’s pregnancy, which he had to find out from Whitney. Stacey explains that she was going to tell him, but that she had a lot going on. Ryan then offers his financial support to Lily and the baby. Sam calls around to Stacey and invites herself to Lily’s first baby scan. Stacey is even further annoyed when she learns that Lily invited Ryan and Ricky along too. In the waiting area, Ryan suggests to Stacey that Lily and the baby may have a better life away from Walford if they lived with him and his wife Helen in Wakefield. Stacey immediately shoots down his idea. During the scan, the midwife asks Stacey and Ryan to leave the room after an argument erupts between them, leaving Sam and Ricky alone with Lily. Later, Ryan proposes the idea of moving away to Lily, without Stacey’s permission. Lily ponders the idea and eventually agrees. Upon Stacey finding out, she has a furious show-down with Ryan back at the Slater house. Whilst out of the room, Lily overhears Ryan ridiculing Stacey by calling her a bad mother. Lily then orders Ryan to leave Walford, which he does, but not before exchanging some harsh words with Stacey, Kat and Whitney.

Creation

In September 2004, an official BBC press release announced an addition to the popular Slater family; the new "feisty female" named Stacey Slater, Charlie Slater's teenage great-niece and second cousin to Kat, Lynne, Belinda and Little Mo, and third cousin to Zoe. According to the report, Stacey "looks like a Slater and shares the same family attitude but with one differenceStacey is one hell of a bitch! [...] She is going to be trouble!"

The 16 year–old actress Lacey Turner was cast in the role. Turner had originally gone to audition for a part in the Miller family, but was given the part of Stacey instead. Commenting on her role, Turner said "I was speechless when I found out that I had been cast as Stacey Slater especially as I knew I would be working with Jessie Wallace who is my favourite actress. I've watched the show since I was about four years old, and I used to live in a house that backed onto the EastEnders set so I used to watch them filming all the time. I always dreamt of being on the show and so I can't believe that I've fulfilled my greatest ambition!" She added, "I'm not like Stacey at all although I love playing her! She's a real challenge [...] I think people are going to love to hate her like they did with [the character] Janine Butcher."

EastEnders scriptwriter Tony Jordan revealed that he created the character with Turner in mind: "I first met Lacey when she came to a casting workshop for the Miller family ... She was leaning against a wall and looked just like Kat Slater, played by Wallace. I thought she would be perfect for the Slater family so I wrote in Stacey's character especially for Lacey."

Development

Personality and lineage
The character appears to be tough, stubborn, fiery and very bitchy, however, as Turner explains, this is just a front and "underneath she's very vulnerable". Turner has described her character as a cross between two other EastEnders characters, Janine Butcher and Kat Slater, saying: "She's very naughty, but she has her reasons for her nastiness."

Over the course of the character's narrative, it was revealed that one of the reasons for Stacey's tough and malicious exterior was her troubled family life — specifically the death of her father, disappearance of her brother, and her mother's bipolar disorder. Addressed in a storyline that aired in December 2005, Stacey returned to live with her "disturbed" mother Jean, played by Gillian Wright, during one of her breakdowns. Jean, who had "sank into the dark despair of her illness", was living in squalor, off her medication, starved, suicidal, and being abused and ridiculed by her neighbours. Stacey was forced to admit her to a mental institution for her own safety. The storyline won a Mental Health Media Award in September 2006.

Romance with Bradley Branning and affair with Max Branning
In 2006, scriptwriters decided to pair Stacey with a new character, Bradley Branning, played by Charlie Clements. Explaining the characters' attraction, scriptwriter Sarah Phelps has said, "Bradley's gentleness makes Stacey a little bit gentler, and Stacey's toughness makes Bradley a little bit tougher."

The couple were shown to face problems in August 2006, when Stacey declared she was pregnant with Bradley's child, and on the advice of his father, Max (Jake Wood), Bradley convinced Stacey to have an abortion.

Scriptwriter Sarah Phelps has described Stacey's abortion as "a dagger in [her] heart ... Stacey thought that if this is what [Bradley] really wants ... 'OK I'll go through with it', but she really didn't want to. He broke her heart."

Although Stacey and Bradley split up at Christmas 2007 when her affair with Max is revealed, they reunite in December 2009 following Stacey's diagnosis with bipolar disorder (see below). Executive producer Diederick Santer commented on the storyline, saying "Bradley and Stacey are together – that's what I want, that's what the audience wants and that's what the characters want. Together, they're very strong and they can take on the world. She's good with him, she takes her medication and on the face of it, she's the Stacey Slater we've always known. As ever with Stacey, though, there's a lot hidden. There are a lot of vulnerabilities there but she and Bradley want to make a go of things."

The 2007 Christmas Day episode in which the affair was revealed is one of the most iconic episodes in EastEnders history and was watched by 14.34 million viewers, becoming the shows' biggest rating in three years and the highest watched TV programme that year altogether.

Bipolar disorder
After losing her friend Danielle Jones, Stacey began acting strangely in May 2009, and the character has to come to terms with the prospect that, like her mother, she also suffers from bipolar disorder. The storyline was developed as of the BBC's Headroom campaign, which aims to encourage people to look after their mental wellbeing. Series Consultant Simon Ashdown had been developing the storyline for about a year. To accurately reflect the issue, EastEnders worked closely with various charities such as Mind and MDF The BiPolar Organisation, medical practitioners and bipolar sufferers when researching the storyline. The story was moulded around what Stacey would do in that situation and what the research led the team to believe was the most truthful way events would develop. Executive producer Diederick Santer said that the initial buildup of the storyline was an extension of how the character has always been, "a character of highs and lows, of great passions and dark moods," but these highs and lows would become more contrasted, and viewers would realise that Stacey's mood is more complex than just being upset over her losses, adding, "It's the beginning of us getting to really know and understand who Stacey is and what makes her behave the way she does." Turner hoped that she could do the storyline justice, saying that she believed it was great that EastEnders continued to raise awareness of the issue.

The first signs of Stacey's odd behaviour were subtle, eventually building up into more extreme acts. One of the earliest indicators was her paranoia over a poster for a fictitious video game, Deprivation, featuring two large eyes on a black background. Ashdown got the idea for this from his research notes, saying, "There were similar sorts of images described by bipolar sufferers when they were experiencing extreme paranoia."

Mind's Chief Executive, Paul Farmer, commented on the storyline, "It's fantastic that a high-profile soap like EastEnders has been prepared to tackle the challenge of exploring a mental health issue through the experience of Stacey — who is such a well-loved and popular character. The degree of research and consultancy they have undertaken to ensure an accurate and honest portrayal of how mental distress affects not only the individual but also family and friends is to be commended. ... We hope ... to dispel the myths about mental health problems and help the public to be more informed about this issue."

Pregnancy, Archie's murder and Bradley's death

On 25 December 2009, storylines showed the character of Archie Mitchell (Larry Lamb) murdered by an unseen person when the bronze bust of Queen Victoria was pushed from the bar of The Queen Victoria public house onto his head. Prior to this, Stacey had told Bradley that Archie raped her when she was suffering from bipolar disorder and she was pregnant with his child. A live episode broadcast on 19 February 2010 revealed Stacey as the killer, moments after Bradley fell to his death after becoming the prime suspect. Following this, a two-hander episode was announced for Stacey and Max, who became the only person to know Stacey was the killer. Santer promised "fascinating" stories for Stacey and Max, saying that the two-hander will explore Stacey's motives for killing Archie, and will be a test for Max as the murder led to his son's death. Santer explained that the murder was not a function of Stacey's bipolar disorder as she was lucid at the time, and she had several sound reasons to be angry with him – he took advantage of her, ruined her second chance with Bradley, caused a chain of events leading to the death of Stacey's best friend Danielle and drove her brother Sean out of Walford. The two-hander also explored the question of whether Stacey really meant to kill Archie. In an interview with magazine Soaplife, Turner said that the baby gives Stacey a reason to live following Bradley's death. However, she predicted in an interview on the official EastEnders website that Bradley's death would lead to a permanent change in Stacey's character, saying that Stacey would struggle with motherhood.

Departure
On 29 April 2010, Turner's decision to leave the show was announced after she expressed a desire to pursue other roles. She said of her departure: "I've had the most fantastic time at EastEnders. Stacey has been such a brilliant role for me to play, as has been part of the feisty Slater family. I'm so lucky to have had such challenging storylines, from the affair with Max and being diagnosed with bipolar to the complete shock of being revealed as Archie's killer during the live 25th Anniversary episode. I'll miss Stacey and everyone in Albert Square very much but the time has come to try something different." Executive producer Bryan Kirkwood added: "We'll be very sad to see Lacey Turner leave the show. Lacey is one of the best young actresses on TV at the moment and the fact that she's won 28 awards in the last five years is testament to this. It's only right that someone as talented and versatile as Lacey should pursue new challenges and we wish her the very best of luck. In the meantime, viewers can look forward to a typically dramatic Slater family exit when she leaves and the door will be left open for Stacey Slater to return to Albert Square in the future." During an interview on This Morning, Kirkwood revealed that Stacey will take centre stage at Christmas and will depart in a "dramatic plotline" and said "Christmas will be all about [Stacey]" and explained the storyline would be "a suitably dramatic and fitting departure for one of the all-time greats". Stacey departed on Christmas Day 2010.

Reintroduction
On 6 December 2013, it was announced that Turner would return to the soap to reprise her role as Stacey, and would begin filming in January 2014. Turner was quoted as saying: "I may have left EastEnders over three years ago but the show has always been in my heart, as has Stacey, and she has never really left my side. I am so excited about returning and seeing what the future holds for her. It's been a while since I set foot in Albert Square and I am looking forward to coming home." Executive producer Dominic Treadwell-Collins added: "Stacey is one of EastEnders best-loved characters, played by one of television's finest actors, and I am tremendously excited that Lacey has decided to return home to Walford. Stacey's last time on the Square was iconic. But that was just the first act. There is so much more to come for Stacey—and her return will send ripples of drama through the Square." Stacey confesses to the murder of Archie Mitchell. Lacey Turner took a break to film the new series of Our Girl. It was confirmed that Stacey will return to EastEnders once filming has finished.

Postpartum psychosis
On 7 December 2015, it was announced that Stacey would give birth at Christmas 2015 and would suffer from postpartum psychosis, a storyline that would continue into "the beginning of 2016 as we explore Stacey's bipolar disorder and its effects on her and those closest to her." The storyline ran from December 2015 to February 2016. Executive Producer Dominic Treadwell-Collins described the storyline as an opportunity to "look at what we are doing as a country to help mothers experiencing this" and also an opportunity to allow Turner to get "her teeth into a really intense storyline." He added: 'We have always had a big commitment to Stacey's story and this time we want to explore the effects of postpartum psychosis on those with bipolar – something which, although a rare illness, is unfortunately more common when mothers with bipolar give birth – and look at what we are doing as a country to help mothers experiencing this.'

Clare Dolman, Bipolar UK's vice chair, said: 'As the national charity supporting people with bipolar, we’ve been glad to work closely with the BBC on Stacey's storyline. There is a very high risk that women with bipolar will become ill when they have a child and 20%–25% of them will have a postpartum psychosis so it's fantastic that EastEnders are raising awareness of this devastating condition.' The show worked with charities Bipolar UK and Mind to develop the storyline.

Custody battle and first maternity leave
On 25 February 2019, it was announced that Turner was pregnant with her first child and would be taking maternity leave, temporarily departing the soap during the year. James Bye, who portrays Stacey's husband Martin Fowler, teased that Stacey's exit would be "dramatic" and "a slightly different exit to what the audience may be expecting", while Davood Ghadami, who portrays Kush Kazemi, added that her departure would be "explosive". Producers created a custody battle storyline for Stacey, Martin and Kush as part of the character's temporary departure from the series. The story also incorporates a feud between Stacey and her cousin Kat Slater (Jessie Wallace), which Jon Sen, the show's executive producer, teased would demonstrate Turner and Wallace "at their finest". On the new story, Laura-Jayne Tyler of Inside Soap opined that Turner was unconventionally not "winding down" before her maternity leave.

When Stacey learns about Kush's plans to apply for joint custody of their son Arthur Fowler (Hunter Bell) from Kat, she goes "ballistic" and Kat realises she has made an error. A show insider explained that Stacey does not want Kush to have legal rights over Arthur and is annoyed that Kat did not inform her. Stacey's discovery leads to a confrontation between Stacey and Martin and Kush and Kat on the market. The insider told Inside Soap Kate White that Kat is empathic towards Stacey, but when Stacey starts berating Kat, she returns the insults. They commented, "The problem with Slater fights is that they get nasty – and by the end of this, no one is speaking to anyone!" Turner explained that both Stacey and Kat are "headstrong" and "will not back down". Stacey then exiles Kat from the family, creating a "horrible and uncomfortable atmosphere" for the remaining family members. Turner stated that Stacey feels "betrayed" by Kat siding with Kush as they have been through so much together.

Writers developed the story by having Kush and Stacey involve legal services. A show insider found the story "daft" and noted that if the family could share custody of Arthur before, why has it become "such a big issue"? They added that the group "need their heads knocking together!" Turner told Tyler (Inside Soap) that Stacey is prepared to go to court to fight for Arthur because "there's [nothing] she wouldn't do for her kids". Kush struggles to pay for his legal fees, so Kat offers to help him by using the stolen money she received from her husband, Alfie Moon (Shane Richie). However, when Kat goes to collect the money, she discovers it missing and calls a family meeting to discuss it. Stacey then "blows her top" when she realises how Kat wishes to use the money. As Kat continues to search for the money, Stacey reveals that she took the money out of fear that Kat would give it to Kush.

The character is also written into another story as she becomes jealous of Max's new relationship with her friend Ruby Allen (Louisa Lytton), which Metro reporter Caroline Westbrook and Radio Times reporter Johnathon Hughes expected to play into Turner's temporary departure. Turner explained that Stacey is surprised to find Max and Ruby together and would not have paired them together, although the actress liked the pairing and thought it made "a great twist". The story also revisits Stacey's feelings for Max, despite her marriage to Martin. Turner noted that despite being secure in her future with Martin, Stacey will "always have a connection with Max", stemming from their past together. The plot was teased in a promotional trailer, released on 15 July 2019.

On 11 July 2019, it was reported that Phil Mitchell (Steve McFadden) would be attacked and "left for dead" in an upcoming story, with the assailant not revealed until transmission. Phil's son, Ben Mitchell (Max Bowden), and secret love rival, Keanu Taylor (Danny Walters), were set up as the main suspects for the attack. Daniel Kilkelly of Digital Spy listed Stacey as a potential assailant and thought it would be a good resolution to the character's feud with Kat and a "handy option" for writing Stacey out of the show. Producers made Stacey the attacker and the twist led to Turner's departure from the soap. In the episode, Stacey knocks Phil out with a spanner after witnessing him in a physical fight with Martin, who was protecting Kat. Turner explained that Stacey attacks Phil in a "blind panic" after spotting Martin in danger and is in "complete shock" afterwards, not processing what happens until she returns home. Ben discovers the situation and takes control, telling Stacey, Martin and Kat to leave. At home, Stacey decides to flee Walford with her children, which allows Turner to leave for maternity leave. The actress believed Stacey's decision stems from her history with the police, and added that she is "petrified" and thinks it is "her only option". Martin decides to go with Stacey, which surprises her. Turner explained that Stacey thought she was protecting Martin by leaving him, but his "true love for Stacey" is showcased as he decides to leave too. On Stacey and Martin's departure, Turner commented, "For now, Walford isn't safe for any of them so that's why they had to vanish." The character departs in episode 5965, originally broadcast on 2 August 2019.

Turner reprised the role for a single episode during her maternity leave and filmed her scenes in August 2019. Stacey returns for a cameo appearance in episode 6014, originally broadcast on 28 October 2019. In her return, Stacey meets Martin in a hotel, where he ends their marriage after Ben threatens to hurt Stacey and their children. Turner made another cameo appearance in episode 6118, originally broadcast on 26 May 2020. In the appearance, her voice was heard speaking to Kush over the phone about Arthur and Jean. On 30 June 2020, it was reported that Turner had returned to filming alongside Wallace, who had been suspended earlier in the year, marking the actress' full-time return after her maternity leave. Turner's return to filming coincided with the soap's return to filming following a break due to the COVID-19 pandemic, and Stacey returns in episode 6133, originally broadcast on 21 September 2020, two weeks after the soap's return to transmission. The narrative states that away from the show, Stacey enters a short relationship with Jerome (Chris Charles), which ends before the government-enforced lockdown. She decides to return after the lockdown, but has been in contact with Kat, who has informed her about Martin's new relationship with Ruby. The relationship features heavily in Stacey's return plot. Turner told Sophie Dainty of Digital Spy that Stacey views Martin and Ruby's relationship as "a bit of a joke" and thinks he is "there for the money". She added that Stacey is annoyed with Ruby because she is "supposed to be her best friend". The actress did not expect their friendship to recover quickly, dubbing it "bitter" with no "way out". Discussing her character's relationship with Martin, Turner explained that Stacey is still in love with him and would reconcile with him if he wished to. Despite this, the actress noted, "But in true Stacey style, she will just put on a front and pretend she doesn't care."

Second maternity leave 
Turner's second maternity leave was announced on 21 September 2020, prior to Stacey's return from the actress' first maternity leave. It was revealed that she would take a six-month break from the soap. Speaking to Annabel Zammit from OK! magazine, Turner pledged her devotion to staying with EastEnders and said that she hoped to remain there until she was 90-years-old. The actress received criticism from fans for leaving so soon after her first maternity leave. She was surprised by the comments, but took it as a compliment to her character. Turner gave birth to her son on 3 February 2021, a month before his due date. She had not finished filming on EastEnders and had two days left before going on maternity leave. Turner spoke with show bosses and informed them that she would be happy to film her exit scenes the following week. She praised them for accommodating to her availability.

Stacey departs in episode 6247, originally broadcast on 1 April 2021. Her exit story sees her being imprisoned for attacking Ruby, which she did not do. Despite efforts from Martin, Jean and Lily to change her mind, Ruby continues with her claim and Stacey pleads guilty in exchange for a lesser sentence. Scenes following the character's exit revealed that Stacey had been sentenced to one-year imprisonment. Turner confirmed that she would return to filming in August 2021. On 29 August 2021, senior executive producer Kate Oates teased Stacey's return revealing that it would tie in with Lytton's upcoming exit from the series. On 30 August 2021, it was announced that Heather Peace had joined the cast as Stacey's "tough-as-nails" prison cellmate Eve Unwin. Eve arrives in Walford following Stacey's release and clashes with Stacey's family and friends. Executive producer Sen looked forward to exploring Stacey and Eve's relationship, while Peace expressed her joy at working with Turner. On their connection, she commented, "We immediately got on and sparked off each other which makes going to work easy and fun."

On 4 September 2021, it was confirmed that Turner would make a cameo appearance for one episode. It was also later confirmed on 14 September 2021 that she would make a second cameo appearance. Stacey returned in episode 6343, originally broadcast on 16 September 2021 and again in episode 6345, originally broadcast on 20 September 2021, as Jean visits her in prison to tell her about Ruby's prison sentence and that she does not have cancer, as she had thought. Stacey returned full time in episode 6365, originally broadcast on 25 October 2021, as she is released from prison.

Reception

Stacey has been proven very popular with fans and has been well received by critics. Kris Green from entertainment website Digital Spy responded to Shelley's 2009 article by saying "With hereditary connections and strong environmental conditions linked to the advancement of bipolar disorder, it's not surprising that Stacey, the daughter of Jean Slater (Gillian Wright) — a long-suffering manic depressive — has developed the same disorder. [...] Granted, the 21-year-old shoulders a fair whack of the programme, but this material is pushing her acting abilities to unseen levels. Lacey's one of the BBC soap's finest actresses and to be handed a story with scenes as powerful as those in last Tuesday's episode must be nothing short of a privilege. The subject matter, however, may be difficult and the portrayal of the condition quite probably more so. It's a given that Stacey's a superb specimen and one of the best female characters in soapland, but quite how the plot is doing the actress a disservice, I'll never know." According to MDF The BiPolar Organisation, calls made by young people to their helplines doubled in six months since the on-screen onset of Stacey's illness. The Bipolar Disorder Research Network also announced an increase in visitors to its website.

Between her introduction to the series in 2004 and the announcement of her departure on 29 April 2010, Turner won a total of 28 awards for her portrayal of Stacey. In 2005, she won best newcomer at the TV Quick Awards, and in 2006 she was awarded best actress at the British Soap Awards. Virgin Media named Stacey and Bradley as one of "Soaps' sexiest couples". In February 2011, the love triangle storyline between Stacey, Ryan and Janine was nominated in the "Best Love Triangle" category at the All About Soap Bubble Awards. Stacey's departure was nominated for 'Best Exit' at the 2011 British Soap Awards. In August 2017, Turner was longlisted for Best Actress at the Inside Soap Awards. She did not progress to the viewer-voted shortlist.

Turner's portrayal of Stacey during the postpartum psychosis storyline earned her much praise from viewers with many commenting that Turner's acting was 'Oscar-worthy.' Turner's acting also won her multiple awards including 'Best Actress' and 'Best Female Dramatic Performance' at the 2016 British Soap Awards. At the same ceremony, Stacey's postpartum psychosis won the award for 'Best Storyline.' A reporter writing for the Inside Soap Yearbook 2017 (a review of the year 2016 in British soap) named Stacey's postpartum psychosis storyline as one of the "best bits of January".

See also
List of EastEnders characters (2004)
"Who Killed Archie?"

References

External links

Fictional market stallholders
Fictional murderers
Television characters introduced in 2004
Fictional characters with bipolar disorder
Fictional bartenders
Fictional salespeople
Fictional hairdressers
Fictional attempted suicides
Fictional characters with psychiatric disorders
Child characters in television
Female characters in television
Beale family (EastEnders)
Fictional nannies
Fictional victims of sexual assault
Fictional prisoners and detainees
Teenage characters in television
Fictional criminals in soap operas
Slater family (EastEnders)
Branning family